Phoxacromion kaneharai is a species of goby native to the Pacific waters around the Ryukyus where it occurs in sheltered bays at depths of from .  This fish seeks shelter under pieces of rubble on pebble or sandy substrates.  Males of this species grow to a length of  SL while females only reach a length of  SL.  This species is the only known member of its genus.

References

Gobiidae
Monotypic fish genera
Fish described in 2010